Teresa Brambilla (23 October 1813 – 15 July 1895) was a celebrated Italian soprano most remembered today for having first interpreted the role of Gilda in Verdi's opera Rigoletto. During a career that spanned 20 years, she sang throughout Italy and in other European cities, including Paris, Barcelona and Odessa.

Life and career
Teresa Brambilla was born in Cassano d'Adda to a musical family. Her parents were Gerolamo and Angela (née Columbo) Brambilla. Teresa was one of five sisters who all became opera singers. Her elder sister, Marietta (1807–1875) was a contralto who specialised in travesti roles and sang in the premieres of several of Donizetti's operas. Her younger sister, Giuseppina (1819–1903) was a mezzo-soprano who appeared in major opera houses in Italy, Spain, and England. Her other two sisters, Annetta and Lauretta, were sopranos who had lesser careers, appearing primarily in Italian opera houses. Like her sisters, Teresa Brambilla studied at the Milan Conservatory, where she first became acquainted with Giuseppina Strepponi, a fellow student and the future wife of Giuseppe Verdi.

After her professional debut in 1831, Brambilla initially sang in several smaller opera houses in northern Italy but in 1833 scored a considerable success at Milan's Teatro Carcano singing Agnese in Bellini's Beatrice di Tenda and the leading soprano role in Fioravanti's Le cantatrici villane. She then appeared on Russia at the Odessa Opera House, which at the time specialised in Italian opera. Upon her return to Milan in 1837, she sang with her sister Marietta at La Scala in the world premiere of In morte di Maria Malibran de Bériot, a cantata in memory of Maria Malibran composed by Gaetano Donizetti, Giovanni Pacini, Saverio Mercadante, Nicola Vaccai and Pietro Antonio Coppola. After singing in Barcelona, she returned to La Scala for the 1839/1840 season in Mercadante's Le due illustri rivali and the world premieres of Mazzucato's  I corsari and Coccia's Giovanna II.

References
Notes

Sources

Forbes, Elizabeth (2008). "Brambilla, Giuseppina", "Brambilla, Marietta", "Brambilla, Teresa", and "Brambilla-Ponchielli, Teresa" in Laura Williams Macy (ed.), The Grove Book of Opera Singers, p. 58. Oxford University Press. 
Matera, Angelo (1971). "Brambilla, Marietta" in Dizionario Biografico degli Italiani, Volume 13. Treccani 
Parsons, Charles H. (1993). Opera premieres: An index of casts/performers. Edwin Mellen Press. 
Rosselli, John (1998). "Opera Production, 1780–1880" in Giorgio Pestelli and Lorenzo Bianconi (eds.), Opera Production and Its Resources (Volume 4 of The History of Italian Opera), pp. 81–164. University of Chicago Press. 
Somerset-Ward, Richard (2004). Angels and Monsters: Male and Female Sopranos in the Story of Opera, 1600-1900. Yale University Press. 

Italian operatic sopranos
People from Cassano d'Adda
1813 births
1895 deaths
19th-century Italian women opera singers